Rolf Botvid (26 December 1915 – 22 July 1998) was a Swedish actor and writer. He appeared in over 30 films. He was the son of actor and comedian John Botvid and was married to actress Marianne Gyllenhammar.

Selected filmography
 The Atlantic Adventure (1934)
 Under falsk flagg (1935) 
 På Solsidan (1936)
 Conscientious Objector Adolf (1936)
 65, 66 and I (1936)
 Kungen kommer (1936)
 Klart till drabbning (1937)
 Happy Vestköping (1937)
 Comrades in Uniform (1938)
 For Better, for Worse (1938)
 Beredskapspojkar (1940)
 The Crazy Family (1940)
 How to Tame a Real Man (1941)
 It Is My Music (1942)
 Kungsgatan (1943)
 Anna Lans (1943)
 Poor Little Sven (1947)
 Father Bom (1949)
 The Biscuit (1956)
 More Than a Match for the Navy (1958)
 Sten Stensson Returns (1963)

External links

1915 births
1998 deaths
Swedish male film actors
20th-century Swedish male actors